A doll is a model of a human being, usually a toy.

Dolls or The Dolls may also refer to:

Film and TV
Le bambole (translated: The Dolls), a 1965 Italian film
Dolls (1987 film), a 1987 film directed by Stuart Gordon
Dolls (2002 film), a 2002 film by Takeshi Kitano
Dolls (2006 film), short British film directed by Susan Luciani
Dolls (2013 film), a 2013 Malayalam drama film directed by Shalil Kallur
Dolls (1995 manga), a manga series by Yumiko Kawahara

Video games and pixel art
Dollz, pixel art of dolls dressed in various outfits
Dolls (Street Fighter), video game characters in the Street Fighter series

Music
The Dolls, a working name for Destiny's Child before they settled on their current name
The Dolls, Swedish studio singers who backed Nova in the 1973 Eurovision Song Contest
"The Dolls" colloquially, to any of the following bands:
The Dresden Dolls,  an American musical duo from Boston, Massachusetts
New York Dolls
Pussycat Dolls

Songs
"Dolls", a song by Ayumi Hamasaki on the album Rainbow
"Dolls", a song by Crystal Castles from Alice Practice EP, 2006
"Dolls", or "Dolls (Sweet Rock and Roll)", a song by Primal Scream, 2006
"Dolls", a song by Bella Poarch, 2022

See also
Doll (disambiguation)